Roy E. Ray Airport  is a privately owned, public-use airport located three nautical miles (4 mi, 6 km) northeast of the central business district of Bayou La Batre, a city in Mobile County, Alabama, United States.

Facilities and aircraft 
Roy E. Ray Airport covers an area of 41 acres (17 ha) at an elevation of 87 feet (27 m) above mean sea level. It has one runway designated 18/36 with a turf surface measuring 2,000 by 150 feet (610 x 46 m).

For the 12-month period ending May 12, 2011, the airport had 6,978 aircraft operations, an average of 19 per day. At that time there were 35 aircraft based at this airport: 91% single-engine, 6% multi-engine and 3% ultralight.

See also 
 List of airports in Alabama

References

External links 
 Aerial image as of 11 February 1997 from USGS The National Map

Airports in Mobile County, Alabama
Privately owned airports